Corsham railway station served the town of Corsham in Wiltshire, England, between 1841 and 1965.

History
The station was on the Great Western Railway main line from London to Bristol and was opened when the Chippenham to Bath section opened in June 1841.

The station was situated in a cutting to the south of the town, with the main station building at the top of the cutting on the town side. There were small shelters with canopies on each of the two platforms. Passengers accessed the up platform using a path, and the down platform from the footbridge. The Station Hotel was situated alongside the main station building.

Corsham had extensive and much-used sidings on both sides of the track to the west of the station, with a goods shed and a loading dock. The main goods traffic was stone from the quarries under Box Hill, which was brought to the lineside by a tramway system of  gauge. A main line siding also extended to an underground wharf in Corsham Down Quarry near the tunnel.

Passenger services were withdrawn from Corsham with the end of stopping services between Swindon and Bath in January 1965. Goods traffic had ended in June 1963, though the siding with the loading dock remained in place until 1978. Of the station structures, only the goods shed now remains; the footbridge is still in place as part of a footpath across the main line.

Stationmasters
On 4 May 1926 the Superintendent for the Bristol Division reported to G.W.R. H.Q at Paddington that the station master at Corsham had withdrawn his labour in support of the General Strike. At the conclusion of the strike, he was moved to Bristol as a booking clerk.

Charles Lanham 1859 – 1897
William Tavinor 1897 – 1898 (afterwards station master at Chepstow)
John Toy 1898 – ca. 1915 (formerly station master at Chepstow)
Thomas Morgan 1915 – 1926 (joined the General Strike and was demoted)
Bruce Conrad Saxon 1926 – 1935 (afterwards station master at Highbridge)
William C. William 1935 – 1939
Cyril Boundy 1941 - 1951 (afterwards station master at Barnstaple) 
D.R. Widdows 1951 – 1956 (afterwards station master at Melksham)
R.M. Ludgate from 1956

Reopening
As the town has grown, reinstating the station has been suggested since at least 2009. In March 2021, a bid was made to the Department for Transport's "Restoring Your Railway" fund for a feasibility study into re-opening the station. In October 2021 it was announced that £50,000 would be provided for further studies. Local MP Michelle Donelan, who had been involved in the bid, said she hoped the new station could be built within five years.

References

External links

Disused railway stations in Wiltshire
Former Great Western Railway stations
Railway stations in Great Britain opened in 1841
Railway stations in Great Britain closed in 1965
Beeching closures in England
railway station